Lake Taylor High School is a public high school located in Norfolk, Virginia and is the "Home of the Mighty Titans". It is administered by Norfolk City Public Schools. The school colors are red and black and its mascot is the Titans. Lake Taylor High is also the home to a NJROTC program and is called The Academy of Leadership and Military Science.

Athletics
The Titans play in the Eastern District. The football team, led by Hank Sawyer, has won numerous district titles throughout the last two decades, and won the Virginia state championship in 2012, 2014, and 2019.  The football team also finished as runners-up in 1982, losing to George Washington-Danville, Salem Spartans in 2015, Woodgrove High School in 2018 and again in 2021 to Salem Spartans.

The Lady Titans basketball team won the state championship in 2010 and 2013, defeating Princess Anne High School on both occasions. The Boys Varsity Team finished as runners-up in 2016, and won the state title in 2018.

Notable alumni
Amos Lawrence  - NFL Running Back
Marvin Mitchell - NFL Linebacker
Bob Saget - American Actor
Brandon Vera - wrestler; mixed martial artist formerly with Ultimate Fighting Championship, current ONE FC Heavyweight Champion
Stephen Furst - Actor; Notable was Animal House
Mike Jamont'e Tyson, NFL cornerback for the Seattle Seahawks
Jalyn Holmes, NFL Defensive end for the Minnesota Vikings
Wilhelmina Wright, Judge of the US District Court for the District of Minnesota
Tommy Graves, NFL Outside Linebacker #50 for the Pittsburgh Steelers 1979 Super Bowl Champions
Julie Forman-Kay, Scientist at The Hospital for Sick Children (Toronto) (SickKids) and professor at University of Toronto

References

Schools in Norfolk, Virginia
Educational institutions established in 1967
Public high schools in Virginia